Royal Lee Bolling Jr. (born May 1, 1944) is an American businessman and politician.

Bolling was born in Boston, Massachusetts. He went to Dorchester High School, Boston University, and Suffolk University. Bolling was involved with the real estate and construction businesses. He is an African-American and a Democrat. Bolling served in the Massachusetts House of Representatives from 1973 to 1986. His father was Royal L. Bolling who also served in the Massachusetts General Court and his brother Bruce Bolling served on the Boston City Council.

See also
 1973–1974 Massachusetts legislature
 Massachusetts House of Representatives' 15th Suffolk district

Notes

1944 births
Living people
Businesspeople from Boston
Politicians from Boston
African-American state legislators in Massachusetts
Democratic Party members of the Massachusetts House of Representatives
21st-century African-American people
20th-century African-American people